The 2023 Mubadala Abu Dhabi Open was a professional women's tennis tournament played on outdoor hard courts. It was the second edition of the tournament as a WTA 500 event on the 2023 WTA Tour. It took place at the Zayed Sports City International Tennis Centre in Abu Dhabi, from 6 to 12 February 2023. The tournament returns to the WTA Tour after two years due to the suspension of St. Petersburg Ladies' Trophy as a result of the Russian invasion of Ukraine.

Finals

Singles

  Belinda Bencic def.  Liudmila Samsonova 1–6, 7–6(10–8), 6–4

Doubles

  Luisa Stefani /  Zhang Shuai def.  Shuko Aoyama /  Chan Hao-ching, 3–6, 6–2, [10–8]

Points and prize money

Point distribution

Prize money

*per team

Singles main-draw entrants

Seeds

1 Rankings are as of January 30, 2023

Other entrants
The following players received a wildcard into the singles main draw:
  Sorana Cîrstea
  Marta Kostyuk
  Garbiñe Muguruza

The following players received entry using a protected ranking into the singles main draw:
  Bianca Andreescu

The following players received entry from the qualifying draw:
  Leylah Fernandez
  Rebecca Marino
  Yulia Putintseva
  Shelby Rogers
  Elena-Gabriela Ruse
  Dayana Yastremska

Withdrawals 
 Before the tournament
  Amanda Anisimova → replaced by  Zheng Qinwen
  Paula Badosa → replaced by  Claire Liu
  Ons Jabeur → replaced by  Karolína Plíšková
  Garbiñe Muguruza → replaced by  Ysaline Bonaventure

Retirements 
  Anett Kontaveit (lower back injury)

Doubles main-draw entrants

Seeds 

 Rankings are as of January 30, 2023

Other entrants
The following pair received wildcards into the doubles main draw:
  Bethanie Mattek-Sands /  Sania Mirza

Withdrawals 
 Before the tournament
  Desirae Krawczyk /  Demi Schuurs → replaced by  Desirae Krawczyk /  Giuliana Olmos
 During the tournament
  Belinda Bencic /  Elise Mertens (fatigue)

References

External links
 website

Abu Dhabi Open
Abu Dhabi Open
Abu Dhabi Open
2023 in Emirati tennis